Chris Anthony is an Arena Football League wide receiver/linebacker for the New York Dragons.

Playing career
He played six seasons for the New York Dragons totalling over 100 regular season and post-season touchdowns. He also served as vice-president of the Arena Football League Players Association from 2008-2010. He attended Iowa State University, where he played football and was a two-time team captain (1999, 2000) and two-time honorable mention All-Big 12 wide receiver (1998, 2000). He caught two touchdowns in Iowa State's first ever bowl victory over Pittsburgh in the 2000 Insight.com bowl.

High school years
Anthony attended Pleasant Valley High School in Riverdale, Iowa and was a letterman in football, basketball, baseball, and track. He was selected all-state in both football and basketball his senior year.

References 

Living people
People from Bettendorf, Iowa
American football wide receivers
American football linebackers
Iowa State Cyclones football players
New York Dragons players
Year of birth missing (living people)